The World Rugby Women's Sevens Series, is a series of international rugby sevens tournaments for women's national teams run by World Rugby. The inaugural series was held in 2012–13 as the successor to the IRB Women's Sevens Challenge Cup held the previous season. The competition has been sponsored by banking group HSBC since 2015.

The series, the women's counterpart to the World Rugby Sevens Series, provides elite-level women's competition between rugby nations. As with the men's Sevens World Series, teams compete for the title by accumulating points based on their finishing position in each tournament.

History
The first 2012–13 series consisted of four tournaments on three continents. The first two events were hosted by the United Arab Emirates (specifically Dubai) and the United States, both of which host events in the men's version. The other two events were hosted by China and the Netherlands.

For the second series in 2013–14, five tournaments took place; a sixth had initially been announced, but never materialized. All nations that hosted events in 2012–13 hosted in the second season, with the added event hosted by Brazil.

The series expanded to six events for 2014–15. The Dubai, Brazil, USA, and Netherlands events remained on the schedule. China was not on the 2014–15 schedule. New rounds of the series were launched in Canada (specifically in Greater Victoria) and London.  Initially, the 2015–16 series was announced with only four events, with London and the Netherlands dropping from the schedule, but a fifth event was eventually added, hosted by France. Events in Australia and Japan were added in 2016–17. With the USA hosting the 2018 Rugby World Cup Sevens, the USA was not on the 2017–18 schedule.

The USA Women's Sevens returned to the schedule for the 2018–19 series, but the event was moved within the season to become the opening event. The same season saw three events move to new locations. First, the USA event moved from Las Vegas to the Denver suburb of Glendale, Colorado. The Australian Women's Sevens, as well as the country's corresponding event in the men's Sevens Series, moved within Sydney from Sydney Football Stadium to Sydney Showground Stadium. This was necessary because the Football Stadium was demolished, with an entirely new stadium to be built on the same site. Finally, the France Women's Sevens, originally set for Paris, was moved to Biarritz, with the date also being moved forward two weeks from its original schedule. This change was promoted by both World Rugby and the French Rugby Federation (FFR) as "enabl[ing] the FFR to maximise the visibility, attendance and impact of hosting the final round of the record-breaking series."

Tournaments

Current events
The World Rugby Women's Sevens Series expanded to eight tournaments in 2019–20. From 2020 to 2022, however, several of these events had to be cancelled due to impacts of the COVID-19 pandemic.

Former hosts of current events

Previous events

Sponsorship
Unlike the men's Sevens Series, which has enjoyed title sponsorship by banking giant HSBC in recent years, the Women's Sevens Series did not have a title sponsor until 2015–16. HSBC is now the title sponsor of both the men's and women's series.

Historical results

Results by season
Summary of the top six placegetters for each series:

Season placings by team 
Tally of top six placings in the series for each team, :

Notes

Format 
Rugby sevens is a version of rugby union, invented in Scotland in the 19th century, with seven players a side on a normal-sized field. 

Games are much shorter, generally lasting only seven minutes per half, and tend to be very fast-paced, open affairs. The game is both quicker and higher-scoring than 15-a-side rugby and the rules are simpler, which explains part of its appeal, and also gives players the space for superb feats of individual skill. Sevens is traditionally played in a two-day tournament format.

The women's series features 12 teams in each tournament: the remaining participants are invited on the basis of regional tournament rankings.

Each tournament uses a format similar to that of the men's series, adjusted for the lower number of teams, with pool play followed by three separate knockout tournaments.

Core teams
Prior to the inaugural season, a group of  "core teams" that are guaranteed places in all series events was announced. This concept is taken directly from the men's series. Unlike the men's series, which features 15 core teams as of the 2012–13 season, the women's series began with only six.

For the 2013–14 series, the number of core teams was increased to eight, all reached the quarter final from the 2013 Rugby World Cup Sevens:

 was invited to participate in all events for the 2013–14 series. This was part of an IRB initiative to help jump-start women's rugby development in the country, which is set to host the 2016 Summer Olympics.

For the 2014–15 series, the number of core teams increased to 11, and qualification was extensively revamped, changing to a system more similar to that currently used in the men's World Series. The top seven teams in the 2013–14 series retained core team status. Four additional core teams were determined in a 12-team qualifying tournament held in Hong Kong on 12–13 September 2014. World Rugby did not initially announce full details of the qualification system for future series, but eventually determined that the top nine teams from the 2014–15 series would retain their status for 2015–16, with a world qualifier following in September 2015.

A combined  team replaced  as a core team for the 2022–23 series.

Current Core Teams

Key: *indicates that the team was invited 

Former core teams

Promotion and relegation

In 2019, World Rugby announced a plan to create a second-tier competition that would allow the best twelve sevens teams, from their region to compete in a similar style format to the Sevens Series for the potential of gaining promotion to the World Rugby Sevens Series and becoming a core team. This breaks from the usual format of promotion and relegation in the sevens series.

From 2017–18 series to 2018–19 series the promotion/relegation was as follows:
 One team is relegated and one team is promoted each year.
 The core team that finishes bottom of the table at the end of the season series is relegated.
 The team that wins the 12-team qualifying tournament at the Hong Kong Sevens is promoted.

From 2020 onwards the style of promotion/relegation will be as such:

 One team is relegated and one team is promoted each year.
 The core team that finishes bottom of the table at the end of the season series is relegated to the Challenger Series.
 Twelve teams will compete for promotion in the Challenger Series event.

Notes

Player awards by season

Points schedule 
The overall winner of the series is determined by points gained from the standings across all events in the season. Twelve teams compete at each event.

Gold, silver and bronze medals were introduced for the top three placegetters at each event in 2016–17, alongside a Challenge Trophy for lower ranked teams the former Plate and Bowl trophies.

Tie-breaking: Should teams finish equal on series points at the end of the season, the tiebreakers are the same as those in the men's series:
 Overall scoring differential in the season.
 Total try count in the season.
 If neither produces a winner, the teams are tied.

See also

 Rugby sevens
 World Rugby Sevens Series (for men)
 Rugby World Cup Sevens
 Rugby sevens at the Summer Olympics

Notes and references

External links 
 

 
Sevens
Women's rugby sevens competitions
Sports competition series
Recurring sporting events established in 2012